Collective laissez faire is a term in legal and economic theory used to refer to the policy of a government to leave trade unions and employers free to collectively bargain with one another, with limited government intervention and oversight. It is predicated on the idea that parties of equal bargaining strength will agree to optimal solutions for economic production and as a matter of fairness.

See also
 Legal abstentionism
 UK labour law

References
 O Kahn-Freund, 'Labour Law' in M Ginsberg (ed), Law and Opinion in England in the 20th Century (Stevens 1959)
 KD Ewing, 'The State and Industrial Relations: 'Collective Laissez-Faire' Revisited' (1998) 5 Historical Studies in Industrial Relations 1

United Kingdom labour law